Fernando Peñalver (1765–1837), was a Venezuelan independence leader and hero of the Venezuelan War of Independence. He was the first governor of the Province of Carabobo (1824–1827). He is buried in the National Pantheon of Venezuela.

See also 
 History of Venezuela
 Venezuelan War of Independence
 Military career of Simón Bolívar
 Spanish American wars of independence

People of the Venezuelan War of Independence
Venezuelan independence activists
1765 births
1837 deaths
People from Anzoátegui
Burials at the National Pantheon of Venezuela